Acanthogonatus nahuelbuta is a mygalomorph spider of Chile, named after its type locality: Piedra del Águila, Parque Nacional Nahuel-Buta, Malleco. Males differ from A. patagallina by having the basal portion of the bulb less rounded and the basal loop of the bulbal duct less sinuous; and from those of A. hualpen by the differently shaped embolus and the palpal tibia with the apical two-thirds (instead of its apical one-third) tapering gradually and having thickened setae.

Description
Male: total length ; cephalothorax length , width ; cephalic region length , width ; medial ocular quadrangle (OQ) length , width ; fovea width ; labium length , width ; sternum length , width . Its labium possesses no cuspules. A serrula is present. Its sternal sigilla is small, oval and submarginal, while its sternum is strongly rebordered. Chelicerae: rastellum is absent. A small, pallid and protruding cheliceral tumescence is present. Colour as in female.
Female: total length ; cephalothorax length , width ; cephalic region length , width ; fovea width ; OQ length , width ; labium length , width ;sternum length , width . Its cephalic region is strongly convex, with a sinuous fovea with short posterior medial notch. Its labium possesses 2 cuspules. A serrula is present. Sternal sigilla is small and oval, while its sternum is rebordered. Chelicerae: rastellum is absent. Its cephalothorax and legs are a reddish-brown colour, while its abdomen is yellowish and densely mottled with dark brown.

Distribution
Provinces of Bío-Bío and Malleco, in Region VIII, Chile.

References

External links

 ADW entry

Pycnothelidae
Spiders of South America
Spiders described in 1995
Endemic fauna of Chile